KLLY (95.3 FM, "Energy 95.3") is a commercial radio station licensed to the community of Oildale, California, and serving the Bakersfield, California, area.  The station is owned by Alpha Media, LLC, through licensee Alpha Media Licensee LLC. It airs a Top 40 music format. KLLY's studios and transmitter are separately located in Oildale.

History
The station was assigned the KLLY call letters by the Federal Communications Commission on February 23, 1984. It was known throughout much of the 1980s and 1990s as Bakersfield's soft rock leader. The station flipped to a "Hot AC" format in 1997. In 2012 the station flipped to Top 40. The station has kept the same KLLY call letters throughout its history, in fact branding as KELLY 95.3 at one point.

On October 10, 2014, Buckley California (the California operations of Buckley Radio), announced their intent to sell KLLY, along with their remaining stations, to Alpha Media, marking Buckley's exit from radio and Alpha's entry into California. The sale was consummated on January 1, 2015.

On June 19, 2015, KLLY rebranded as "Energy 95.3". No other changes come with the rebranding, except in its musical shift from Mainstream to Rhythmic, which resulted in Mediabase moving KLLY to the Rhythmic panel in July 2015. Shortly after the panel change, KLLY started to revert toward a Top 40 playlist which resulted in Mediabase moving KLLY back to the Top 40 panel in November 2015

Previous logos

References

External links
Energy 95.3 official website

Contemporary hit radio stations in the United States
LLY
Radio stations established in 1984
Alpha Media radio stations